Malagala is a small village near Padukka Town in the Colombo District, Western Province. Malagala, which is a part of the  Avissawella electorate is situated 42.3 kilometers north west of Colombo, the commercial capital of Sri Lanka. Malagala is near the Kaluthara District boundary.

Location 
Malagalalies is in western Sri Lanka. Its geographical coordinates are 6° 48' 0" North, 80° 7' 0" East.

Populated places in Colombo District